Rachel Morin (born 29 February 1948) is a French sports shooter. She competed in the women's 10 metre air pistol event at the 1988 Summer Olympics.

References

1948 births
Living people
French female sport shooters
Olympic shooters of France
Shooters at the 1988 Summer Olympics
Place of birth missing (living people)